Lala-Bisa is a Bantu language of Zambia that is closely related to Bemba.

Swaka dialect is divergent, and sometimes classified as a separate language (Nurse 2003). Maho (2009) lists Biisa (Wisa), Lala, Ambo, Luano, and Swaka as distinct languages, with Ambo and Luano closest to Lala.

References

Languages of Zambia
Languages of the Democratic Republic of the Congo
Sabi languages